The Minor Pillar Edicts of Indian Emperor Ashoka refer to 5 separate minor Edicts of Ashoka inscribed on columns, the Pillars of Ashoka, which are among the earliest dated inscriptions of any Indian monarch. A full English translation of the Edicts was published by Romilla Thapar.

These edicts are preceded chronologically by the Minor Rock Edicts and may have been made in parallel with the Major Rock Edicts. The inscription technique is generally poor compared for example to the later Major Pillar Edicts, however they are often associated with some of the artistically most sophisticated pillar capitals of Ashoka. This fact led some authors to think that the most sophisticated capitals were actually the earliest in the sequence of Ashokan pillars and that style degraded over a short period of time.

These were made probably made at the beginning of the reign of Ashoka (reigned 262-233 BCE), from the year 12 of his reign, that is, from 250 BCE.

History
Ashoka was the third monarch of the Maurya Empire in India, reigning from around 269 BCE. Ashoka famously converted to Buddhism and renounced violence soon after being victorious in a gruesome Kalinga War, yet filled with deep remorse for the bloodshed of the war. Although he was a major historical figure, little definitive information was known as there were few records of his reign until the 19th century when a large number of his edicts, inscribed on rocks and pillars, were found in India, Nepal, Pakistan and Afghanistan. These many edicts were concerned with practical instructions in running a kingdom such as the design of irrigation systems and descriptions of Ashoka's beliefs in peaceful moral behavior. They contain little personal detail about his life.

List of the Minor Pillar Edicts 
Asoka’s Minor Pillar Edicts are exclusively inscribed on several of the Pillars of Ashoka, at Sarnath, Sanchi, Allahabad (a pillar initially located in Kosambi), Rummindei and Nigali Sagar. They are all in the Prakrit language and the Brahmi script.

These pillar edicts are:

The Schism Edicts

Asoka’s injunction against shism in the Samgha. Found on the Sarnath, Sanchi and Allahabad pillars.
These are among the earliest inscriptions of Ashoka, at a time when inscription techniques in India where not yet mature. In contrast, the lion capitals crowning these edicts (Sarnath and Sanchi) are the most refined of those produced during the time of Ashoka.

All the Schism edits are rather fragmentary, but the similarity of their messages permit a clear reconstruction:

The Queen's Edict

Ashoka announces that the Queen should be credited for her gifts. Found on the Allahabad pillar.

Commemorative inscriptions
Although generally catalogued among the "Minor Pillar Edicts", the two inscriptions found in Lumbini and at Nigali Sagar are in the past tense and in the ordinary third person (not the royal third person), suggesting that are not pronouncements of Ashoka himself, but rather later commemorations of his visits in the area. Being commemorative, these two inscriptions may have been written significantly later than the other Ashokan inscriptions.

The Lumbini pillar inscription

Records the visit of Ashoka to Lumbini, location of the birth of the Buddha, in today's Nepal. 

The Nigali Sagar pillar inscription

At Nigali Sagar, Ashoka mentions his dedication for the enlargement of the Stupa dedicated to the Kanakamuni Buddha.

Inscription techniques

The inscription technique of the early Edicts, particularly the Schism Edcits at Sarnath, Sanchi and Kosambi-Allahabad, is very poor compared for example to the later Major Pillar Edicts, however the Minor Pillar Edicts are often associated with some of the artistically most sophisticated pillar capitals of Ashoka, such as the renowned Lion Capital of Ashoka which crowned the Sarnath Minor Pillar Edict, or the very similar, but less well preserved Sanchi lion capital which crowned the very clumsily inscribed Schism Edict of Sanchi. These edicts were probably made at the beginning of the reign of Ashoka (reigned 262-233 BCE), from the year 12 of his reign, that is, from 256 BCE.

According to Irwin, the Brahmi inscriptions on the Sarnath and Sanchi pillars were made by inexperienced Indian engravers at a time when stone engraving was still new in India, whereas the very refined Sarnath capital itself was made under the tutelage of craftsmen from the former Achaemenid Empire, trained in Perso-Hellenistic statuary and employed by Ashoka. This suggests that the most sophisticated capitals were actually the earliest in the sequence of Ashokan pillars and that style degraded over a short period of time.

The Rummindei and Nigali Sagar edicts, inscribed on pillars erected by Ashoka later in his reign (19th and 20th year) display a high level of inscriptional technique with a good regularity in the lettering.

Description of the Minor Pillar Edicts
The Minor Rock Edicts of Ashoka are exclusively inscribed on some of the Pillars of Ashoka, at Sanchi, Sarnath, Allahabad, Rummindei and Nigali Sagar.

See also 

 Related topics
 Ancient iron production
 Dhar iron pillar
 History of metallurgy in the Indian subcontinent
 Iron pillar of Delhi
 List of Edicts of Ashoka
 Pillars of Ashoka
 Stambha

 Other similar topics
 Early Indian epigraphy
 Hindu temple architecture
 History of India
 Indian copper plate inscriptions
 Indian rock-cut architecture
 List of rock-cut temples in India
 Outline of ancient India
 South Indian Inscriptions
 Tagundaing

References

External links

 On The Origin Of The Early Indian Scripts

Indian inscriptions
History of Gujarat
Linguistic history of India
Edicts of Ashoka
Memorials to Ashoka
Tourist attractions in Junagadh district
Junagadh